Djuna Bernard (born 15 June 1992) is a Luxembourger politician and member of the Luxembourg's Green Party, Déi Gréng. She has been a member of the Chamber of Deputies since December 2018, when she replaced Sam Tanson who was made Housing and Culture Minister, making her the youngest deputy in the Chamber at 26 years old. She stood as a candidate for the co-presidency of The Greens in January 2019, and subsequently won in March that year and currently serves with Meris Šehović. Bernard and Šehović were both re-elected unopposed in March 2021. She has declared her intention to stand in the South circonscription for the 2023 Luxembourg general election.

See also

List of members of the Chamber of Deputies of Luxembourg 2018–2023

References

Living people
1992 births
The Greens (Luxembourg) politicians
Luxembourgian feminists
Members of the Chamber of Deputies (Luxembourg)
21st-century Luxembourgian women politicians
21st-century Luxembourgian politicians
University of Luxembourg alumni
Heidelberg University alumni
Luxembourgian expatriates in Germany